SuperBand is a spin-off of Project SuperStar, a popular singing talent-search competition in Singapore. Contestants are bands of 2 to 6 people.

To mark the opening of the first season, a special SuperBand Big Jam where all the 18 bands made their debut at Suntec City's Fountain of Wealth, and was aired as a special at 8:45pm on April 9, 2006. After which, the show was broadcast at 7:30pm on Monday starting from April 10, 2006 for the first 4 episodes of Season 1. Subsequent episodes were aired at 8:00pm. The results show were aired 'live' at 11:30pm on MediaCorp Channel U. For Season 2, all shows were on Monday at 8:00pm from June 16, 2008 with the results show delayed at 11:30pm after an earlier recording at about 10:00pm. An exception was on August 18, 2008, when the main show was aired at 7:00pm due to the telecast of the National Day Rally's English speech at 8:00pm. The band with the lowest overall scores would be eliminated every week. The scores are determined by judges' scores (50%) and by audience voting (50%).

The judges for Season 1 were Y.E.S. 93.3FM DJ Dennis Chew, Producer Li Yi Wen, Billy Koh and Li Si Song. The hosts were Milk, Jeff Wang, Belinda Lee and SuperHost champion Charlyn Lin.

In season 2, the judges are Bao Xiao Song, Jiu Jian and Cavin Soh. The hosts were Dasmond Koh and Y.E.S. 93.3FM DJ Lin Peifen. Tang Ling Yi also served as host but only on the first episode of the results show, after she requested to venture in the entertainment industry outside of Singapore.

Season 1

Season 1 was broadcast from April 10 to August 5, 2006.

All bands competed every week at 7.30pm on Monday for the first 4 episodes of Season 1. Subsequent episodes were aired at 8 pm. The results show were aired 'live' at 11.30pm on MediaCorp Channel U. The band with the lowest score is eliminated. The grand final was held on August 5, 2006 at 7.30pm at the Singapore Indoor Stadium in a 3.5 hour finale.

The table below shows a summary of all the 18 finalists in Season 1. Mi Lu Bing beat Soul in the final round 65% to 35% to win the inaugural SuperBand.

Notes
Soul's member Ishi Lau Gek How, died of mysterious circumstances on June 28, 2007 in his own car parked in a carpark at the National Stadium. Rumours were that the former dance instructor committed suicide.
Soul came back as special guest appearance on August 25, 2008 on the second season of SuperBand, with only three members.

Season 2

Season 2 started on June 16, 2008, and ended with the grand final on October 5, 2008.

The actual competition started on June 23. The bands are randomly divided into two groups and compete on alternate weeks. Similarly, the band with the lowest score and the lowest votes in the respective group would be eliminated. The groups only start competing weekly during the three rounds of semi-finals. All shows start on Monday at 8:00pm from June 16, 2008, except August 18, 2008 at 7:00pm, with the results show delayed at 11:30pm after an earlier recording at about 10:00pm. The grand final was held on October 5, 2008 at 7:30pm in a special 3.5 hour finale.

The table below shows a summary of all the 16 finalists in Season 2.

Notes (Season 2)
Butter Huang from 三月 was a former member for his band Amber, whilst Xiao Long aka Lawrence from 樱 was a former member from Jade.

References

External links
 Program Format

Singaporean reality television series
Singaporean singing competitions